Angelo Ross (March 12, 1911 – September 23, 1989) was an American film editor and sound engineer. He was nominated for an Academy Award in the category Best Film Editing for the film Smokey and the Bandit. Ross died in September 1989 in Hollywood, Florida, at the age of 78.

Selected filmography 
 Smokey and the Bandit (1977; co-nominated with Walter Hannemann)

References

External links 

1911 births
1989 deaths
American film editors
American audio engineers
20th-century American engineers